MyGov may refer to:

 myGov, an Australian Government platform to access government services
 MyGov.in, an Indian government citizen engagement platform
 Mygov.scot, a Scottish Government public sector information website